Mirzo Tursunzoda (formerly Karamkul) is a jamoat in Tajikistan. It is part of the city of Hisor in Districts of Republican Subordination. The jamoat has a total population of 20,303 (2015).

References

Populated places in Districts of Republican Subordination
Jamoats of Tajikistan